, known professionally by the stage name , is a Japanese musician and songwriter who is signed to SME Records. Beginning his career as an independent musician in 2012, he made his major debut with the release of his first major album Basin Techno in 2016. The album includes the song "Music Video", which became a viral hit in Japan for parodying common tropes used in music videos. That same year, he performed the song "Pose", which was used as the first closing theme for the anime series Pokémon: Sun & Moon. He has also written music for commercials and for other musicians.

Biography
Oka was born in Nishinomiya, Hyōgo Prefecture on July 3, 1989. When he was around three years old, he and his family moved to Uji, Kyoto Prefecture, where he would spend much of his early life. While in elementary school, he started learning to play the piano and became part of a local baseball team. His interest in music began at an early age, when he began listening to artists such as Eminem, Queen, and Deep Purple. To further his music skills, he would compose songs on the Nintendo DS game Daigasso! Band Brothers.

Upon graduating from high school, Oka enrolled at Doshisha University and started working part-time at a video store. He then became part of a band called , which disbanded after a year when one of its members emigrated to America. He then became part of another music group, while starting a new part-time job at a supermarket.

Following his graduation from university in 2012, Oka began his music career as an independent musician under the stage name Taiiku Okazaki. The following year, he released two more albums,  and Fictional Zodiac.

In 2016, Okazaki made his major debut on the SME Records label with the release of the album Basin Techno. The album ranked first on iTunes's J-Pop chart, and peaked at number 9 on Oricon's Weekly Album Charts. The song "Music Video" from the album became a viral hit in Japan for its lyrics and music video, which parodied commonly-used tropes in Japanese music videos.

That same year, he began performing songs for various commercials, as well as writing music for other artists.

In 2017, Okazaki released his second major album, XXL, which peaked at number 2 on Oricon's Weekly Album Charts. The album includes the song "Natural Lips", which features lyrics that are in Japanese but sung in a way that makes them resemble English words. The following year, he performed the song , which was used as a closing theme for Pokémon: Sun & Moon. He released his third major album, OT Works, in April 2018; the album peaked at number 18 on Oricon's Weekly Album Charts. In October of that year, his song  began to be used as the fourth opening theme to Pokémon: Sun & Moon.

Okazaki released his fourth studio album, Saitama, on January 9, 2019; the album peaked at number 5 on Oricon's Weekly Album Charts. He made a voice acting cameo in Pokémon Sun and Moon as a rapping Team Skull member, and he will hold a solo live concert at the Saitama Super Arena on June 9, 2019.

Discography

Singles

Albums

Filmography

Film
 Mahjong Horoki 2020 (2019), Doku
 Kappei (2022), Horita

Television
 Manpuku (2018), Charlie Tanaka
 Pokémon the Series: Sun & Moon (2019), Akitoshi (Ep. 115)
 Kore wa Keihi de Ochimasen! (2019), Kazuo Umagaki
 Isonoke no Hitobito - 20 nengo no Sazae-san (2019), Nakajima
 Boku wa Doko kara (2020), Shun
 MIU 404 (2020), Kameda (Ep. 3)
 DCU: Deep Crime Unit (2022), Nanao Morita
 Cap Kakumei Bottleman DX (2022), Tycoon Ochazaki
 What Will You Do, Ieyasu? (2023), Torii Suneemon

Notes

References

External links
Official website 

1989 births
21st-century Japanese male actors
21st-century Japanese male singers
21st-century Japanese singers
Actors from Hyōgo Prefecture
Doshisha University alumni
Japanese male film actors
Japanese male pop singers
Japanese male singer-songwriters
Japanese male television actors
Japanese techno musicians
Living people
Male actors from Kyoto Prefecture
Musicians from Hyōgo Prefecture
Musicians from Kyoto Prefecture
Sony Music Entertainment Japan artists